Santa Teresita Airport  is an airport serving Santa Teresita, an Atlantic coastal town in the Buenos Aires Province of Argentina.

The Santa Teresita non-directional beacon (Ident: STR) is located on the field.

See also

Transport in Argentina
List of airports in Argentina

References

External links
OpenStreetMap - Santa Teresita Airport
OurAirports - Santa Teresita Airport

Airports in Argentina